York (Layerthorpe) railway station was a railway station in the village of Layerthorpe in York, North Yorkshire, England.

History 

Opened on 19 July 1913, it served as the northern terminus of the Derwent Valley Light Railway, where the line connected to the existing Foss Islands Branch Line and thence to the North Eastern Railway's York to Scarborough Line.

Traffic through the station was predominantly agricultural freight and local industries along the route of the DVLR, although passenger services did run on the line from 1913 to 1926. After closure to passengers, excursions were occasionally operated—often these were for bramble picking on Skipwith Common—hence the line is sometimes known as the "Blackberry Line".

A summer-only steam passenger service was operated from 1977 to 1979. The DVLR closed on 27 September 1981. A single siding at the station serving an oil depot remained in use until 1987. The siding was lifted along with the Foss Island branch when traffic from Rowntrees chocolate factory, at the other end of the branch, switched to road transport in 1988.

References

External links

 Layerthorpe station on navigable 1947 O. S. map

Disused railway stations in North Yorkshire
Rail transport in York
Railway stations in Great Britain opened in 1913
Railway stations in Great Britain closed in 1926
1913 establishments in England